Karl-Heinrich Erich Moritz von Groddeck (19 July 1936 – 14 December 2011) was a German rower who won three Olympic medals for the United Team of Germany: a silver in the coxed pairs in 1956 and a gold and a silver in the eights in 1960 and 1964, respectively. He also won one world and five European titles in these two rowing events between 1956 and 1964 for West Germany. In 1964 he retired from competitions.

Back in 1958, von Groddeck moved from Wiesbaden to Hamburg to work for Axel Springer AG as a journalist in the sports section of a newspaper. For many years he was reporting the history of German rowing. Later he worked as a freelance journalist.

References

1936 births
2011 deaths
Olympic rowers of the United Team of Germany
Rowers at the 1956 Summer Olympics
Rowers at the 1960 Summer Olympics
Rowers at the 1964 Summer Olympics
Olympic gold medalists for the United Team of Germany
Olympic silver medalists for the United Team of Germany
Olympic medalists in rowing
West German male rowers
World Rowing Championships medalists for West Germany
Medalists at the 1964 Summer Olympics
Medalists at the 1960 Summer Olympics
Medalists at the 1956 Summer Olympics
People from Vorpommern-Greifswald
European Rowing Championships medalists